The Administrative building of the North-Kazakhstan regional executive committee is located on Constitution Street, 13, Petropavl.

The building was built in the 1930s, intended for the construction of the building of the Siberian Joint-Stock People's Bank. In the 1930s, the North Kazakhstan Regional Executive Committee was located there.

In the 70s, there were dining rooms and restaurants, a canteen, and the editorial office of the newspaper Leninskoye Znamya. Currently, it is restored and there you can find shopping areas of a private central department store and a supermarket.

The building is two-story, brick, unplastered. The corner of the building is decorated with round tower with a conical roof. The windows are rectangular. The roof is hip. After the restoration work and reconstruction, a mansard floor was built.

Literature
 ГАСКО. Ф. 158 « Личный фонд Бенюха М. И.».
 ГАСКО. Ф. 3037. Инв. № 7425.
 Северо-Казахстанская область. Энциклопедия. Алматы. 2004. Сс. 435-437.

Buildings and structures in North Kazakhstan Region